The ERA Real Estate Classic was a golf tournament on the LPGA Tour from 1979 to 1980. It was played at Brookridge Country Club in Overland Park, Kansas.

Winners
1980 Donna Caponi
1979 Sandra Post

References

Former LPGA Tour events
Golf in Kansas
Sports in the Kansas City metropolitan area
Overland Park, Kansas
History of women in Kansas